Ippolit Konstantinovich Vogak (sometimes spelled Wogack, 30 August 1829 – 16 July 1889) was an Imperial Russian Navy admiral and the 17th and last governor of Taganrog.

Biography 
Vogak graduated from Cadet Corps in 1847, served in the Baltic Fleet, and was a participant of the Crimean War. He was promoted to the rank of captain-lieutenant in 1862, captain second rank in 1870, and captain first rank in 1873. He was then promoted to the rank of rear-admiral in 1883. 

Vogak commanded the battleships Novgorod and Petr Velikiy in 1874-1880, as well as imperial yacht of the House of Romanov Livadia. He was a junior flag-officer (младший флагман) of the Black Sea Fleet in 1884-1885 and junior flag-officer of the Baltic Fleet in 1887-1889.

From 1885 to 1887, he served as Governor of Taganrog.

Vogak died on 16 July 1889 in Saint Petersburg and was buried at the Smolenskoe Lutheran Cemetery.

External links 
 Vogak genealogy in Erik-Amburger-Datenbank 

Imperial Russian Navy admirals
Russian untitled nobility
Governors of Taganrog
1889 deaths
1829 births
Naval Cadet Corps alumni